Cambridge Glacier is a wide sheetlike glacier between the Convoy Range and the Coombs Hills, draining south into the Mackay Glacier between Mount Bergen and Gateway Nunatak. It was surveyed in 1957 by the New Zealand Northern Survey Party of the Commonwealth Trans-Antarctic Expedition, 1956–58, and named by them after Cambridge University, where many of the various Antarctic scientific reports have been written.

References
 

Glaciers of Scott Coast